Nan Su Yati Soe (also spelt Nansu Yati Soe, born 18 September 1987) is a Burmese actress, model, singer and TV host who has achieved fame and success as an actress and singer. Throughout her successful career, she has acted in over 200 films and released two solo albums.

Early life and education
Nansu Yati Soe was born on 18 September 1987 in Yangon, Myanmar. She was an ethnic Shan-Burmese descent. She is the middle daughter of Soe Lin, a businessman and chairman of Echo Trading Co., Ltd, and his wife Tin Tin Win. Nansu has an elder brother and younger brother. She attended high school at Basic Education High School No. 1 Dagon. She matriculated and joined University of Pharmacy, Yangon. And graduated B.A (English) in distance education at University of Distance Education, Yangon in 2017.

Career

Beginning as a model
Nansu Yati Soe began her modeling career while in Grade 10, for Biosoft shampoo television commercial. Then, she appeared on local magazine and journal cover photos. Nansu has appeared as advertising model in over 100 commercial advertisements include DORU whitening cream, Mistine Lipstick, Ginvera shampoo, Wax One, Gionee Mobile Phone, Mandalay FM and Sky Net DTH, etc.

Nansu has worked with many international model agencies and marketing companies from Thailand, Korea, Philippines, Indonesia, Hong Kong, Singapore and USA to promote their international products.

2004–2005: Acting debut and recognition
Nansu officially entered the entertainment industry in 2004. She made her acting debut with main role in the film Moe Louk Gyi Chit Tal, alongside Lu Min and other three actresses in 2004. She then portrayed the female lead in film Hna Lone Thar Yae Ashin Thakhin (The Lord of Heart) with Lu Min in 2005. The film was both a domestic hit in Myanmar, and led to increased recognition for Nansu Yati Soe.

2007–present: Breaking into the big screen and career success
In 2007, Nansu took on her first big-screen main role in the film Hot Shock 2, with together Moe Aung Yin, Thu Htoo San, Eaindra Kyaw Zin, Moht Moht Myint Aung and Thinzar Wint Kyaw which premiered in Myanmar cinemas in 2009. The film was a huge commercial success, and becoming the most watched Burmese film at the screened time. She has been starred in over 10 big screen films and over 200 direct-to-video films in her acting career since the day.

In 2016, Nansu attended an event at Shanghai International Film Festival as a representative from Myanmar. She also attended to Indonesia to take part in "Asean Celebrity Explore Quest Malaysia" (ACEQM) which is held with famous celebrities and models from South East Asia countries. Nansu and Paing Takhon together performed with U Shwe Yoe and Daw Moe dance at the event.

In 2017, she starred in horror series Ghost Hunter, where she played the leading role with Kyaw Kyaw Bo, Myat Thu Kyaw, Nwe Darli Tun, aired on MNTV in 2017.

Television host
Nansu is also work as a TV host for local TV stations. She has appeared in many talk show programs and reality show such as Champion of Dance for MRTV-4, Designers' design weekly program and Mailbox program for Myawaddy TV. Also many entertainment and infotainment TV programs for Sky Net which can cover over 50 million people in Myanmar.

Music career

Nansu started out on her music career while still in acting career. She released her first single song "May May Su Late Mal" in 2005 and gained the first recognition from her fans.

In 2007, Nansu started endeavoring to be able to produce and distribute a solo album. She launched her debut solo studio album Moe Ma Myin Lay Ma Myin (Unaware of My Surroundings) in 2008. The album was sold out over 2 million copies in Myanmar. Songs from her first album May May Su Late Mal (new version), "Kaw La Har La" and "Ngar Yin Tway Khon Nay Loh" were hit songs of the country and which gained her to nationwide recognition. Since released a solo album, she participated in stage performances, and many concerts at various locations throughout Myanmar. Moe Ma Myin Lay Ma Myin video album was released in 2010.

In 2013, Nansu released her second solo studio album Shae Sat Thwar Mhar Pal (Forward) which spawned more huge hits. Many music industry records have followed since then and being sold out over 10,000 copies in 4 months. Forward video album was released in 2015.

Nansu performed in the opening ceremonies of the 2013 Southeast Asian Games in Naypyidaw on 22 December 2013. In 2016, she released a single "Moe Thachin" (Moe Song) on her Facebook page. In 2017, she released a single "Yuu Aung Chit Ya Thu" on her Facebook page at her birthday. That song got 1.5 million views within 24 hours and then 4 M views in 4 days.

On 3 October 2018, she released a single song called "May May Su Mhar Soe Loh" MV on her Facebook page which earned 1 million views within 24 hours and then 2 million views in 4 days.

Brand ambassadorships
Nansu currently works as a brand ambassador of Shangpree Cosmetics since February 2018 and brand ambassadorship contract with Samsung. In January 2016, she was appointed as an ambassador of Hope For Children to development of children and reduce deaths of children.

Personal life
Nansu was in a relationship with hip hop singer G Fatt in 2017, but they broke up in November 2019.

Filmography

Film (cinema)

A Lann Zayar (2011)
A Lann Lun A Lun Lann (2012)
A Mike Sar (2013)
A Lann Zayar 2 (2013)

Film

 Over 200 films

Discography

Solo albums
Moe Ma Myin Lay Ma Myin (Unaware of my surroundings) (2008)
Shae Sat Thwar Mhar Pal (Forward) (2013)

Singles
May May Su Late Mal (2005)
Moe Thachin (2016)
Yuu Aung Chit Ya Thu (2017)
May May Su Mhar Soe Loh (2018)

References

External links

1987 births
Living people
Burmese film actresses
Burmese female models
21st-century Burmese actresses
21st-century Burmese women singers
Burmese singer-songwriters
People from Yangon
Burmese people of Shan descent